The Kadazans are an ethnic group indigenous to the state of Sabah in Malaysia. They are found mainly in Penampang on the west coast of Sabah, the surrounding locales, and various locations in the interior.

As a result of integration in culture and language, as well as for political initiatives, the new term "Kadazan-Dusun" was created to combine the two "Kadazan" and "Dusun" groups. Together, they are the largest ethnic group in Sabah. Kadazan-Dusun has been recognised as an indigenous nation of Borneo with documented heritage by the United Nations Educational, Scientific and Cultural Organization (UNESCO) since 2004.

Origins of the term 'Kadazan'
An extensive research was carried out by Gundohing Richard Francis Tunggolou entitled, The Origins and Meanings of the terms "Kadazan" and "Dusun". The article explains in detail on the origins of the Kadazan term.

Is it believed that there is evidence to suggest that the term has been used long before the 1950s. The Bobolians or the Bobohizans of Borneo were interviewed to seek better picture of the true meaning of the term 'Kadazan'. According to a Lotud Bobolian, Bobolian Odun Badin, the term 'Kadazan' means 'the people of the land'. A Bobohizan from Penampang, Gundohing Dousia Moujing, gave a similar meaning of Kadazan and reiterated that the term has always been used to describe the real people of the Land.

Over a hundred years, the Kadazans were ruled by the Brunei Sultanate; the Kadazan or Kadayan (in Lotud, Kimaragang, Liwan etc.) were referred to officially by the Sultanate as the 'Orang Dusun' which literally means 'people of the orchard' in the Malays language. Administratively, the Kadazans were called 'Orang Dusun' by the Sultanate (or more specifically the tax-collector) but in reality the 'Orang Dusun' were Kadazans. An account of this fact was written by the first census made by the North Borneo Company in Sabah, 1881. Owen Rutter wrote in 1927 that the native people residing in Papar preferred to call themselves as Kadazans. Administratively, all Kadazans were categorised as Dusuns. Only through the establishment of the KCA (Kadazan Cultural Association) in 1960 was this terminology corrected and replaced by 'Kadazan'. When Sabah, Sarawak, Singapore and Malaya formed the Federation of Malaysia in 1963, administratively all Dusuns born since were referred to as Kadazans.

Initially, there were no conflicts with regard to 'Kadazan' as the identity of the 'Orang Dusun' between 1963 and 1984. In 1985, through the KDCA (formally called KCA) the term Dusun was reintroduced after much pressure from various parties desiring a division between the Kadazan and the 'Orang Dusun' once again. This was largely successful and a precursor to the fall of the ruling political state party Parti Bersatu Sabah (PBS). PBS, through the KCA, then coined the new term 'Kadazandusun' to represent both the 'Orang Dusun' and 'Kadazan'. Today, both Singapore and Malaysia acknowledge the ethnic group as Kadazandusun.

Genetic studies 
According to a Genome-wide SNP genotypic data studies by human genetics research team from University Malaysia Sabah (2018), the Northern Borneon Dusun (Sonsogon, Rungus, Lingkabau and Murut) are closely related to Taiwan natives (Ami, Atayal) and non–Austro-Melanesian Filipinos (Visayan, Tagalog, Ilocano, Minanubu), rather than populations from other parts of Borneo Island.

Culture

Kadazan culture is heavily influenced by the farming of rice, culminating in various delicacies and alcoholic drinks prepared through differing home-brewed fermentation processes. To'omis and linutau are the main rice wine variants served and consumed in Kadazan populated areas, and are a staple of Kadazan social gatherings and ceremonies.

The most important festival of the Kadazans is the Kaamatan or harvest festival, where the spirit of the paddy is honoured after a year's harvest. This takes place in May, and the two last days of the month are public holidays throughout Sabah. During the celebration, the most celebrated event is the crowning of the Unduk Ngadau, the harvest festival beauty queen. Young women of Kadazan, Dusun, Murut or Rungus descent from certain districts compete for this title. The beauty pageant is held to commemorate the spirit of Huminodun, a mythological character of unparalleled beauty said to have given her life in exchange for a bountiful harvest for her community.

In marriages, dowries are paid to the bride's family and an elaborate negotiation is arranged between the groom and bride's families. As a traditional gesture of politeness and civility, the dowry is metaphorically laid out with match sticks on a flat surface, and representatives from each side push and pull the sticks across a boundary to denote the bargaining of the dowry. Dowries traditionally consisted of water buffaloes, pigs, sacks of rice and even urns of tapai. Modern dowry negotiations also include cash and land ownership deeds. The dowry includes the costs of the wedding with any additional costs above the price of the dowry to be paid for by the brides family. Kadazan women from the Penampang and Dusun women from the Keningau, Ranau and Tuaran districts are widely regarded to have the most expensive dowries.

While it is traditionally customary for Kadazans to marry within a village or a neighbouring village, a downshift of xenophobia over the past few decades has eased the difficulty once associated with interracial marriage. Due to the overwhelming Christian influence and some marriages to Muslim spouses, resulting in a mandatory conversion to Islam, still induces outrage and rejection and is known to divide fiercely traditional Kadazans.  Islam has lately been embraced by a growing minority as a means to political ends considering the fact that the local Malay minority has gained political ascendance in recent years.  Ruling Malay political parties have also openly been giving political and economical privileges to Kadazans who agree to convert to Islam as well as to other non-Christian Kadazans. Conversion to Islam, in a Malaysian context, also results in an automatic conversion by law of ethnicity to Malay (source?) . The resultant demographic shift has in recent years further compounded the dwindling numbers of the Kadazan-Dusun community and consequently making it more challenging in its efforts to preserve the heritage. (statistics?)

Cuisine

Traditional Kadazan cuisine involves mostly boiling or grilling which employs little use of oil, and with locally unique modifications and nuances as well as particular usage of locally available ingredients, particularly bamboo shoots, sago and fresh water fish. From simple appetizers of unripe mango dressed with soy sauce and chili flakes to a variety of pickled foods collectively known as noonsom, tangy and pungent flavours from souring agents or fermentation techniques is a key characteristic of traditional Kadazan cooking. One of the most well known Kadazan dishes is hinava, which is similar in concept to the South American ceviche.

It is a salad made with pieces of raw fish marinated in citrus juice, ginger, onion and other ingredients like bitter gourd and grated dried bambangan seed which is similar in texture to desiccated coconut strands. This dish is sometimes served in certain Sabahan restaurants which do not otherwise have a traditional Kadazan menu.

Another popular dish is pinasakan, which consists of sea or freshwater fish (usually smaller species) cooked with bambangan (a variety of mango found in Borneo) or takob-akob (a very tart dried fruit). The bambangan fruit is also eaten with meals as an appetiser. It is often pickled as  noonsom and garnished with grated bambangan seed. Tuhau is a fragrant local root that is often made into a salad or is preserved with vinegar as noonsom.

Wild boar or bakas, whether char grilled, stewed or even made into noonsom is very popular with the Kadazandusun community, often an essential item at weddings and major gatherings. Sweets include hinompuka, a type of gooey rice cake steamed in banana leaves and flavoured with dark palm sugar. The Kadazan people are also renowned for lihing, a sweet-tasting wine brewed from glutinous rice and natural yeast.

Contemporary Kadazan food is influenced by Chinese and Malay food as well as international trends, and often sees the use of traditional ingredients interpreted in new and novel ways. For example, bambangan is available as an ice cream flavour and chicken lihing soup or sup manuk nansak miampai lihing is popular with both Chinese and Kadazan communities alike. Lihing is also used in marinades, local variants of sambal relishes and even as a flavouring for stir-fried noodles.

Music and Dance
The Kadazans have also developed their own unique dance and music. Sumazau is the name of the dance between a male and female, performed by couples as well as groups of couples, which is usually accompanied by a symphony of handcrafted bronze gongs that are individually called tagung. A ceremonial ring of cloth sash is worn by both male and female. The Sumazau and gong accompaniment is typically performed during joyous ceremonies and occasions, the most common of which being wedding feasts. The sompoton is another musical instrument.

The Kadazan have a musical heritage consisting of various types of tagung ensembles – ensembles composed of large hanging, suspended or held, bossed/knobbed gongs which act as drone without any accompanying melodic instrument. They also use kulintangan ensembles – ensembles with a horizontal-type melodic instrument.

The late Chief Priestess Bobohizan Bianti Moujing from Kg. Kandazon and the High Priestess Bobohizan Binjulin Sigayun from Kg. Hungab were consulted during their heyday on the evolution of tagung or gongs and the beats rhythm. Recently, O.K.K. Datuk Jintol Mogunting, the former District Native Chief of Penampang, who was an authority on the traditional culture and customs was also consulted and he gave similar narration of the legend that has been used for centuries of generations.

It was said that after the resurrection of Huminodun, from the original Bambaazon, the lifestyle of the Nunuk Ragang community as they were then known, began to improve as there was an abundant supply of food. The legend goes on to narrate that the spirit of Huminodun founded the Bobohizans as they were taught the art of rites, ritual practices and ceremonies, taboos, traditional cultures including the art of gong beating and the Sumazau dance. During the civilisation of Nunuk Ragang, the Bobohizans taught the people to fashion bamboos into various lengths, shapes and sizes and arranged them into an ensemble of seven musical instruments, the seventh item being the drum (gandang), which we know today as tongkungon, tongunggu and tongunggak. The Bobohizans then taught the people the beat rhythm of tagung, known today as magagung, botibas and dunsai. Another musical instrument, the Kulintangan; akin to the xylophone, would be played as an accompaniment to the magagung.

In the late 18th century, the Bruneian traders introduced brass gong canons and brasswares in North Borneo. The Kadazans were fascinated with these new brass items as they perceived the brasswares elegant and gong sound melodious. Then, they began to acquire collections of these brass times as family heirlooms and the gongs were arranged into the typical ensemble of seven instruments, to replace the bamboo gongs. Since then, the gong beats and rhythm were improved for a variety usage. The gong beats to accompany any ritual ceremonies are usually monotonous.

As for weddings, festive occasions and welcoming receptions for dignitaries, the rhythm of the gong beat is exhilarating, melodious, lively and smooth. Sometimes the botibas gong beat is performed as variation. During funerals, the dunsai gong beat is very solemn and fearsome as a symbol of respect for the dead. The single beat of a solitary gong at short intervals was used to be signal for emergencies such as house on fire and missing people who were lost in the jungle or drowning. However, there are only a few of Kadazan people that know the skills of beating the tagungs. It would require one long practice to gain experience.

It has been an issue that the present-day Kadazan youths are not inclined to gain skills in playing the traditional music instruments. Thus, magagung competitions and Sumazau competitions are organised at the village level not only to mark the Kaamatan celebrations but rather to preserve and promote the culture of Kadazan music and dance. Eventually, the competitions are held at district level where the Sumazau competitions were judged according to its choreography and the magagung according to the gong beats, rhythm and tempo.

In the early 1900s, these brass items were valuable items and became a symbol of family wealth. Once, they were highly in demand as dowries for marriage. Families that did not have them face difficulty meeting dowry requirement and would be compelled to search for these items elsewhere before the wedding. This custom still prevails in certain districts. Notably, many districts have most of the dowry converted into cash. As for the badil or canons, brassware and especially the gongs, they have become priceless and rare commodities.  An ordinary set of gongs would cost about RM10,000 and the best set with high quality sound would cost around RM15,000. The original gongs, though popularly known as brass, are not entirely brass. They are actually made of composites of iron, brass and copper, to produce a smooth, reverberating and xylophonic tone. Gongs made entirely of brass are not popular because the sound produced has a flatsonic resonance.

Kulintangan or miniature gongs consist of nine ensemble and according to preference, it may be performed simultaneously with the gong to enhance the gong music. The latest type of gongs are made entirely of flat iron sheets, that were produced in Kudat. These are usually available at the weekend market or Tamu in Donggongon, Penampang in which each set would cost between RM700 to RM1,500. The sound quality of these gongs are more like cymbals clashing and shrills. People who are interested to know the best-quality melody gongs may drop by to any magagung and Sumazau competitions during Ka'amatan Harvest Festival from 30 to 31 May at the Hongkod of Kadazan Dusun Cultural Association (KDCA) in Penampang.

Religion
The majority of the Kadazans are Christians, mainly Roman Catholics and some Protestants. Islam is also practised by a growing minority. Prior to the conversion to Christianity and Islam, the dominant religion was Momolianism, which some scholars equate to animism.

Animism

Animism was the predominant religion prior to the arrival of Roman Catholic missionaries during British North Borneo administration in the 1880s. The Protestant influence is due to later British influence during the 20th century. There was no "religion" for ancient Kadazan-Dusuns and to them, it was just a sort of relationship between the seen and the unseen.

The Kadazan belief system centres around a single omnipotent deity called Kinorohingan. Rice cultivation is the center of Kadazan life and as such, various rites and festivals are celebrated and revolve around paddy cultivation. Kaamatan is the most recognisable festival attributed to the Kadazan-Dusun. This annual festival is essentially a thanks-giving ceremony and in the olden days also serve to appease the rice spirit, Bambaazon. Special rituals are performed before and after each harvest by a tribal priestess or a spirit medium known as a Bobohizan.

Additionally, the majority of the Kadazan-Dusun people believe that the spirits of their ancestors dwell on the top of Mount Kinabalu. The Kadazans call this mountain Akinabalu which consists of two words 'Aki' which means ancestors and Nabalu (or Nabahu) that means 'coffin'. Thus combined, Akinabalu means 'abode of the dead'. Bobohizan does a ritual every year to appease the guiding spirit of the mount. The purpose of conducting such rituals is to placate the spirit of Mount Kinabalu as well as the ancestral spirits. The religious ceremonies are understood to be a means of seeking the spirit's sanction and soliciting
their protection during a climb.

The Kadazan community as a ritual isolate is in constant interaction with the spirit world. This involves a number of sacrificial ceremonies to create a balanced ritual state between the Kadazans and the spirit world. The Kadazans believe in four principal spirits; the Almighty Creator (Minamangun), a living person's spirit (koduduvo), the ghostly spirit of the dead (tombivo) and the evil spirit (ogon).

The significance of Bobohizan

When asking for help from a Bobohizan to cure someone's prolonged or severe illness, the priestess is usually called upon. The Bobohizan would be informed with the latest information that will give her a good background in locating to the cause of sickness.

Bobohizans can also do preliminary consultations with the susukuon or the good spirit consultants. Before the Bobohizan goes to the house of the sick person the next day, she firstly would have to consult her susukuon the night before as to find the best way possible, determining the right offerings she could approach in the healing ceremony. She will then know whether a chicken, a pig or even a buffalo would be needed as a sacrifice. At some time, it may only take a simple inait or prayer to heal the sick. There are a number of inait or prayers that a Bobohizan has to choose depending on the cause of the sickness. The basic is the popo'ontong or sumuku to get in touch with the good spirit consultants for further guidance.

The Bobohizan may proceed to any of the following or other form of prayers which are; searching for strayed spirit of the sick person and preparing for its homecoming, appeasing the evil spirits that cause the person's sickness with the offerings, reaching the stage of Rundukon or being in the trance of possible dialogue with the evil spirit in which the priestess becomes the oracle for communicating in attempt to know the evil spirit's intentions. It is the longest performance of the Bobohizan that could last for almost 24 hours.

They also can read the prayers to 'cleanse the debris' that has been induced into the person's body by evil spirit, cure a person from the effects of black magic and liberate a sick person from the grip or disturbance of the dead. After being treated by Bobohizan for a day, sometimes for three days, one is not allowed to go out from the house.

The honouring of Bambaazon

In preparation for the ceremony, the village priestess carefully select stalks of paddy and ties them together just before the harvesting period starts. These stalks are left in the field and not to be cut or tampered with until the harvesting is completed. The selected stalks of paddy symbolise the spirit of paddy, which is Bambaazon. As soon as the harvest is over, these stalks are cut by the priestess and taken into the house of the owner of the field. The spirit would be in the house. Magavau will then take place when the padi is winnowed and stored away into the barns.

The ceremony of Magavau

The ceremony of Magavau begins just after sunset. The priestess and her attendants sit on the floor in the living room and start chanting ancient prayers (inaait) to Bambaazon. This continues further into the night. Thereafter, the priestess and attendants stand up and circle slowly around the living room, while chanting. After a while, they start to sing songs of praise to Bambaazon. At this stage, the men join in the circle, singing together with the priestess and attendants. As they sing, they stamp their feet on the floor in rhythmic timing and at regular intervals uttering the awe-insparing "pangkis" which is the triumphant cry of the Kadazans. This ceremony will go on until the break of dawn when preparations are made to feed Bambaazon with the fermented rice (habot), with ingredients similar to tapai, prepared especially for the Bambaazon in the previous evening and tapai. The ceremony ends with merry making as a mark of thanksgiving. Bambaazon stays in the house, guarding the paddy in the barn until the next planting season when another ceremony known as monogit is performed to take 'her' to the paddy field.

Here is an instance of the prayers or incantations,

 Odoi kada' kati gangang arai
 kotunguan ko do pa'is 
 otimbaar ko do sadap
 odoi kososodop zou do mogiginipi
 kosou ku do nokotimung kito 
 do pamakanan do karamaian diti
 Nga ino noh maan zou 
 do mamagavau do paai diti
 do ounsikou nodi kaka do Bambaazon
 do kosuni vagu do to'un tiso 
 do ka'anu no vagu kotimung kito
 om ogumu' nodi do pamakanan tokou mantad do paai

Historical beliefs

The ancestors of present-day Kadazans were among the people who have migrated from Taiwan. They can be referred to as Taiwanese aborigines (Formosan people). A research has stated, "Over the next thousand years to 1500 BC, the Austronesians spread south through the Philippines to the Celebes, the Moluccas, northern Borneo and eastern Java. One branch went east from the Moluccan Island of Halmahera about 1600 BC to colonize eastern Melanesia (1200 BC) and Micronesia (500 BC). The migration had continued well into Polynesia by 0 AD and on to Hawaii and Easter Island by the year 500. The Austronesians finally reached the last uninhabited land on earth, New Zealand, sometime around 1300."

There is a contrary belief that the ancestors of the Kadazans came from Yunnan. If there is some truth in this, the question arises whether or not they migrated first to Taiwan and then went southwards at a later period.

The discovery in 1958 of the 37,000 year-old "Deep Skull" of a Homo sapiens by Tom and Barbara Harrisson in the Niah Caves in Baram in present-day Sarawak, led some to propose the "out of Borneo" theory of human migration in parts of Asia.

Nunuk Ragang era

Prehistoric Kadazan can be traced back to the time in which the Nunuk Ragang tree had existed. It is roughly located to-date at Tampias, where two rivers (Liwagu and Gelibang) meet to the east of Ranau and Tambunan. Nunuk is a Dusun word for banyan tree. Ragang as well comes from the Dusun word "aragang", which means "red". Nunuk looks like a giant mangrove tree with highly developed buttress stems with deep indentions that provide good natural shelters. The Nunuk Ragang or 'the red banyan tree' as told by the old folks, Widu Tambunan, measured of six out-stretched arms in circumference. The top of its canopy was estimated to be able to shelter under its seven joined Kadazan-Dusun huts, in which a hut measures 12 by 20 feet. Its numerous branches and giant thick foliage provided for ideal shelter and habitat of wild life, birds, insects and even spirits according to local beliefs. It was believed that the roots of the giant tree produced red latex that had a great medicinal value. In fact, the Nunuk's latex is still used to treat rashes and other minor skin diseases in modern days.

Evacuation from the Nunuk Ragang area due to the Minorit Push of Nunuk Ragang, was decided through a meeting between the Bobohizans and the people. The leaders had made an agreement that the Tagahas (literally "strong") people were given a role to be the rear guard while others were immediately leaving Nunuk Ragang. River tributaries became their principal guidance to the direction of migrating.  Each group's direction of migration is guided by the flow of Liwagu River. A Bobohizan said that, had the Kadazan-Dusuns not moved out of Nunuk Ragang, they would have not existed today.

The Kadazan and Rungus migrated out of Nunuk Ragang through Labuk River. The grouping of Kadazan and Rungus later arrived in Tempasuk, Kota Belud through the Marak-Parak valley. This is where they made the decision to split, in which one group would be heading to Matunggong, Kudat and the other would be heading to the West Coast, particularly Penampang and Papar. Initially, the Kadazans' settlement was an area with an abundant growth of mangroves ("tangar-tangar"), the area is believed to be present-day Beluran. Hence, they are referred to as Tangara or Tangaa. As for the Rungus, they had reached an area described to have the presence of white sand ("pirungusan"), which gives an explanation of how the Rungus obtained their demonym.

The Kadazan and Rungus share similarities in their languages, most probably because of the close relationship at Nunuk Ragang. As they settled the West Coast, the Kadazans met the Bruneians and other settlers. Barter trade occurred in which the Kadazans had their gongs, copper and silver wares, necklaces and bangles from the Bruneians.

P.S. Shim's theory

According to P.S. Shim's book "Inland People of Sabah: Before, During and After Nunuk Ragang" published in 2007, states that the ancestors of the Kadazandusuns came from Baram, Sarawak starting from the year 1200.

P.S. Shim insisted that the Kadazan tribe settled the plains of Kimanis, Papar around 1220. Another group which identify themselves as the Tatana tribe settled in Bundu, Kuala Penyu. Subsequently, a great number of Kadazans migrated from Papar to Putatan-Penampang in the 1800s. Specifically, the first group was the Tangaa group. The second group was given the name 'Bangkaakon', which followed afterwards.

There was a war between the Tangaa and Bangkaakon which is believed to have occurred somewhere in Tombovo, Putatan. 
The altercation was impactful enough that the Bangkaakon group had to move out and consequently made a settlement in an area known today as Minintod, Inanam.

Kadazan in Rungus folk tale

According to the legends that are told from generation to generation, the so-called Momogun Rungus was founded by a man who was persecuted by his brothers because he had various skills. He was good at making animal traps and making weapons which were capable of protecting his community then. It was because of his skills, he was persecuted. This caused him to be punished with his faithful wife and people by banishing them into the ocean.

The ships that they had boarded, were stranded on the island of Borneo, so they headed to Pampang Nabalu for religious purposes. He called himself an 'Usan-Usan', who had no family as he was being persecuted by his own siblings.

While they were there, they were resurrected with religious spirits, following their worship of Lumaag Nabalu. Religious ceremonies continued to evolve as they were increasingly crowded. A religious figure proficient in law who inherited the customs of Usan-Usan was Aki Bobolizan Gomburon. As the crowd grew more, they felt that it was necessary for the laws of the society to be gazetted according to the rules of Usan-Usan.

Aki Bobolizan Gomburon enforced the most stringent Law of Gomburon that if someone committed adultery, they would be drowned into water by inserting them into a trap or 'diaper' alongside a large stone. The stone must be chosen by the offender. If anyone intentionally murdered (someone or something), then the person would be punished as well.

These rules continued until Aki Bobolizan Guraumanuk received a revelation from Lumaag Nabalu to abolish the Law of Gomburon. According to the revelation, any sin may be redeemed or paid with a slaughter which was referred to as "mangaraha" (pork slaughter).
All sins that could be redeemed with slaughter of lives, should be redeemed through the sacrifice of one's livestock. This task was done by a "Bobolizan", which roughly means "payer of sin and middle person in begging for forgiveness to Kinoringan". The meaning of "Bobolizan", derived from the Rungus word "bwolzi" which means "to buy". Pigs that were used to get a blessing or ask forgiveness from Kinoringan cannot be called "vogok/wogok" ("a pig") but it should be called "bwolzi". "Bwolzi" refers to the role of the animal in sacrifice as a redeemer so that the offender can get a new spirit after sin redemption.

Then, the Momogun population grew more and more during the era of Aki Nunuk Ragang. Aki Nunuk Ragang was the most well-known Bobolizan in developing the teachings of Labus religion (animism). Before Aki Nunuk Ragang passed away, Aki Bobolizan Guraumanuk received a message from Lumaag Nabalu. This message was regarding a new rule in which the three sons of Aki Nunuk Ragang must migrate to anywhere else because Lumaag Nabalu told that all the rivers flowing from Mount Kinabalu to the sea, belonged to Momogun. Therefore, the Momogun grandchildren or descendants should choose a high place, a hill or the highest mountain in any area they would settle at. All the rivers that flowed to the sea from the highest hills were the places guarded by the spirit of Lumaag Nabalu by inviting it through a ceremony called Momurinaait (mentioning seven names of the main spirits that guarded the Momogun).

Bobolizan Guraumanuk's teachings were developed by Aki Nunuk Ragang. All of Aki Bobolizan Guraumanuk's will was proclaimed by Aki Nunuk Ragang. Three sons of Aki Nunuk Ragang were Aki Rungsud (ancestor of the Rungus), Aki Longuvai (ancestor of the Kadazan) and Aki Turumpok (ancestor of all Dusun tribes).

Aki Nunuk Ragang sent his sons Aki Rungsud (the eldest son) and Aki Longuvai (second son) to the coast by conquering Pompod Tana (Kudat, Kota Marudu and Pitas) so as not to be disturbed by Mizonvaig's invasions. According to the message they received through the Rundukon (approached by Lumaag that spoke in an incomprehensible language), told that the meeting area rahat kotonobwon (sea to the west) and rahat kosilzahon (sea to the east) began to be invaded by outsiders (pirates). Aki Nunuk Ragang decided to take control of the entire coastal area to keep the people safe. Therefore, the men responsible for the security of the coast were Aki Rungsud and Aki Longuvai.

Aki Turumpok as the youngest son was regarded as Tandon Tongkob (inheriting father's house) in which Aki Turumpok inherited his father's home. Tandon Tongkob still exists in the custom of the Rungus people today. "Tandon tongkob" means "the content or occupant that remains in the room". So, Aki Turumpok was the heir of Kg. Nunuk Ragang and became a leader there.

Soon, Aki Nunuk Ragang died and was buried near a deep lake. The lake is located in the present place called Kampung Tampias in the area of Lubuk Sugut, Sandakan. According to legend, after 40 days Aki Nunuk Ragang was buried, on the day of the ceremony "Mongupus", there grew a fig tree at the middle of Aki Nunuk Ragang's grave. The fig tree was quite different because it was red and if the leaves were scratched, the tree would release human blood. Then, the people of Aki Nunuk Ragang worshipped the tree and named it Nunuk Ragang because they believed the tree was the incarnation of Aki Nunuk Ragang.

Aki Rungsud managed to conquer Pompod Tana and their descendants were referred to as Momogun Rungus. Meanwhile, Aki Longuvai was struggling. He was not willing to leave Nunuk Ragang for his wife was heavily pregnant and they would follow Aki Rungsud later. Aki Rungsud's journey would be marked with kukurungan (chicken cages) as indications. It was because every hilltop which would have been passed by Aki Rungsud, required a chicken to be sacrificed in order to call upon the guarding spirit of Borneo, Lumaag, and as the declaration of power over the territory they had passed through.

When Aki Longuvai was tracking his brother's route, he had mistaken the direction. This was all due to one route, in which there were two pathways that were going towards opposite directions. Kukurungan marked by Aki Rungsud throughout the pathway of the journey unfortunately had been moved by a person with a bad intention, to the false position. As a result, Aki Longuvai was lost in the journey of tracking Aki Rungsud's path until they reached Pinampang or Penampang area ("Pinampang" most probably comes from the Kadazan/Rungus word "pampang" which means "large rocks"). They lacked the supply of food then they decided to make a hillyard there.

After a long time, they did not come to Pompod Tana. Aki Rungsud eventually found out through Lumaag that Aki Longuvai was lost. Aki Rungsud instructed his men to find Aki Longuvai and luckily they found Aki Longuvai in Pinampang. The servants of Aki Rungsud invited Aki Longuvai to join a mission in Pompod Tana but Aki Longuvai declined the invitation. This was because Aki Longuvai was not willing to live in a war and to be in the state of emergency there. To fulfill their father's request, Aki Nunuk Ragang kodori (the late), Aki Longuvai promised to send his eldest son, Aki Bulun who was born after they came out of Nunuk Ragang. Aki Bulun, without anyone, came to Pompod Tana when he was 17 years old. Aki Bulun however was accompanied by seven extraordinary or highly immune dogs that were said able to beat a tiger.

In the session of dividing Pompod Tana into certain areas, Aki Bulun and Aki Rungsud made divisions of the area by marking the boundaries through a method that was by how far the sound of Aki Rungsud's gong could be heard. Thus, the attentive observers were camping at every hilltop in the Pompod Tana area at that time to hear the gong sounds. If the sound of the gong could not be heard any more, then a spear would be pierced into the ground, called Binorudan. Binorudan was a spear used by coastal warriors which was as large as a yacht paddle, moderate in size.

Today, Aki Bulun's descendants are known as Rungus Gonsomon who once dominated the east coast of Kudat. If further detailed, the language of Rungus Gonsomon is almost the same as the Kadazan language. Due to the large number of dialects in Kadazan-Dusun ethnicity, it is believed that the original language used before the separation of Aki Rungsud and Aki Longuvai was Momogun Rungus. As the colonialists initially colonised the Penampang area, it had an early development with the establishment of shops for the colonial business's interests at that time. According to the ancestors, the people of Aki Longuvai who settled in the area of "kedai-kedai" or shops, were originally known as Kadazan people. In Rungus, kakadazan refers to "shops" or basically a town. When the Aki Rungsud people refer to the Aki Longuvai people, they would call them tulun antad sid kakadazan which means "people from the shop areas or more advanced place."

The Nunuk Ragang area, after a while, became a place of chaos because Aki Turumpok abandoned the Labus religious laws (animism). Aki Turumpok was more likely to be in the competition of magical powers which resulted in the Nunuk Ragang area getting a kopizo (a bad sign). Whatever they do would result in contention and hostility to one another. This condition ended with the spreading of a disease because the mamasi ceremony was not performed.

Language

The Kadazan dialect has adopted several loanwords, particularly from other northern Borneo indigenous languages and also Malay.

The use of the language has been declining due to the use of Malay by the Malaysian federal government and by the use of English by missionaries, which was done through the method of language shift enforced by the work of both the colonial and federal governments. The state of Sabah has introduced policies to prevent this decline, which is also happening to other native Sabahan languages. This included the policy of using Kadazan and other indigenous languages in public schools. Efforts have also been done to allow the language to become official in the state.

In an earlier 2005 Unesco's report, the Kadazan-Dusun language was classified as an endangered language, spoken by a mere 300,000 people. The language has apparently joined the 7,000 other languages worldwide that face the threat of extinction. On the bright side, Datuk Philip Lasimbang, Chair of Board of Directors Kadazandusun Language Foundation (KLF) had stated that the Kadazandusun language will never go extinct because it has entered our education system, is formalised and has been institutionalised.

The similarities between the Kadazan and Dusun languages are sufficient for speakers of these two languages to understand each other easily. In a nutshell, the most salient distinction between these two languages are the differences in their phonemic charts.

Unification
Presently, the Kadazans are associated together with another similar indigenous tribe, the Dusuns and various other indigenous peoples, under the blanket term Kadazan-Dusun. This is officially recognised as the result of political machinations, specifically a resolution of the 5th KCA (Kadazan Cultural Association, which was then renamed to Kadazan-Dusun Cultural Association (KDCA)) Delegates Conference held between 4 and 5 November 1989. It was decided as the best alternative approach to resolve the "Kadazan" or "Dusun" identity crisis that had crippled and impeded the growth and development of the Kadazan-Dusun multi-ethnic community socio-culturally, economically and politically – ever since Kadazan versus Dusun sentiments were politicised in the early 1960s.

Kadazans and Dusuns share some similarity in language and culture albeit with differences in dialect. Many consider their traditional geographical influences as the major difference between the two ethnic groups. Kadazans are mainly inhabitants of the flat valley deltas, conducive to paddy field farming, while Dusuns are traditionally inhabitants of the hilly and mountainous regions common to the interior of Sabah.

Indigenous status
Being indigenous to Sabah and a part of Malaysia, Kadazans are conferred the same political, educational and economic rights as the predominant Malay population of Malaysia. The term ascribed to this is Bumiputra (from Sanskrit Bhumiputra), a Malay word, which is translated to 'Sons of the Land'.

See also
 Monsopiad

References

 
Ethnic groups in Sabah